Qila Mubarak, is a historical monument in the heart of the city of Bathinda in Punjab, India. It is recognized as monument of national importance and maintained by Archaeological Survey of India. It has been in existence from 1100 to 1200 AD in its current place and is the oldest surviving fort in India. It was here that Razia Sultan, the first woman to take charge of the Delhi throne was incarcerated upon her defeat and dethroned.  The bricks of the fort date back to the Kushana period when emperor Kanishka ruled over Northern India/Bactria. Raja Dab, along with emperor Kanishka, is believed to have built the fort. Qila Mubarak in latter part of the 10th Century was under the rule of Jayapala, a ruler of the Hindu Shahi dynasty.

Architecture 
The Imperial Gazetteer of India describes the fort having 36 bastions and a height of about 118 ft. It was a conspicuous landmark for many miles around.

History 

Quila Mubarak Bathinda was constructed by Raja Dab during the period 90-110 AD. Raja Dab was the ancestor of Vena Pal. The bricks used to construct the fort dates back to the Kushana Period. The fort was constructed by the king so that Huns could not invade the kingdom of Emperor Kanishka. In the later years, the fort has undergone various types of alteration done by the rulers of the area. Razia Sultana, the first Empress of Delhi had been imprisoned in Quila Mubarak. Hindu chronicles of Kashmir described it as Jaipal's capital, and say it was captured by Mahmud of Ghazni. Bhatinda appears in the works of the historians from early Muhammadan period as Batrinda, often incorrectly converted into Tabarhind. The fortress was enhanced many times under the rule of the Mughal Empire, especially under the energetic Mughal Emperor Akbar. About 1754 Maharaja Ala Singh of Patiala state conquered Bhatinda.

Fort repairs

Currently, a team working with the Akal Society of America, after conducting an extensive two year survey of the site has submitted a proposal of repairs to the Archaeological Survey of India (ASI). The proposed repair work will be funded by external funds provided by the ASA though the former Chief Minister, Captain Amarinder Singh, announced a government contribution of Rs. 12,500,000 (US$275,000) for Qila Mubarak's repair on 21 June 2005 at a ceremony held to mark the tercentenary celebrations of Guru Gobind Singh's visit to the fort.  While awaiting final approval (which has been granted on the state level in Punjab, but not yet by the ASI), minor internal repairs are in progress at a slow pace. As on 20-02-2011, the fort is closed for repair work. While visiting it is advised to check beforehand.

This fort is extra ordinary in its exitance, currently under Archaeological survey of India. The repair work has been finished and the fort is now there to welcome tourists.

When Babur came in India for the first time, he came here with cannons. Four of them are here in this fort that are made up of an alloy of silver, gold, copper and iron.

See also
 Qila Mubarak, Patiala

Gallery

References

External links

 No record of antiquities at Quila Mubarak

Ghaznavid Empire
Kushan Empire
History of Punjab
Forts in Punjab, India
Bathinda
Archaeological sites in Punjab, India